This is a list of universities in Martinique.

Universities 
 Campus Caraïbéen des Arts
 University of the French West Indies and Guiana - Martinique campus

See also 
 List of universities by country

References

Martinique
Martinique
Education in Martinique

Universities